Dănilă Artiomov (born 16 October 1994 in Tiraspol) is a Moldovan swimmer, who specialized in breaststroke events. Artiomov established a Moldovan record of 1:01.60 to earn a gold medal in the boys' 100 m breaststroke at the 2012 European Junior Swimming Championships in Antwerp, Belgium.

Artiomov qualified for the men's 100 m breaststroke at the 2012 Summer Olympics in London by eclipsing a FINA B-standard entry time of 1:02.30 from the Ukrainian Championships in Dnipropetrovsk. He challenged seven other swimmers on the second heat, including Olympic veterans Malick Fall of Senegal, Vladislav Polyakov of Kazakhstan, and Jakob Jóhann Sveinsson of Iceland. Artiomov rounded out the field to last place by nine hundredths of a second (0.09) behind Syria's Azad Al-Barazi in 1:03.57. Artiomov failed to advance into the semifinals, as he placed fortieth overall in the preliminaries.

References

External links
NBC Olympics Profile

1994 births
Living people
Moldovan male breaststroke swimmers
Olympic swimmers of Moldova
Swimmers at the 2012 Summer Olympics
People from Tiraspol
20th-century Moldovan people
21st-century Moldovan people